"Please Don't Go" is a song by American recording artist Mike Posner, released as the second single from his debut album 31 Minutes to Takeoff (2010). Posner co-wrote and co-produced the song with Benny Blanco. J Records released the single to contemporary hit radio in the United States on June 9, 2010. The song peaked at number 16 on the Billboard Hot 100, giving Posner his second top 40 hit on that chart. It also peaked at numbers 9, 18, and 30, on the Mainstream Top 40, Rhythmic, and Adult Top 40 charts, respectively. It managed to peak within the top 40 in countries like Austria, Canada, Germany and New Zealand. A remix of the song features American rapper Waka Flocka Flame.

Composition
Posner co-wrote and produced the song alongside Benny Blanco. Posner's lyrics plead for his girlfriend not to leave him, while his production with Blanco is uptempo and contains prominent synth-pop and trance characteristics. In addition, Blanco provides background vocals in the chorus. The song was mixed by Serban Ghenea and engineered by John Hanes and Tim Roberts.

Commercial performance
In the United States, the song debuted at number 94 on the Billboard Hot 100 and reached number 16. It also reached number 9 on the Billboard Pop Songs chart. As of January 2011, 1,000,000 copies had been purchased.
It also charted on the New Zealand charts and on the Canadian charts. It peaked at number 23 in Canada and reached number 19 in New Zealand, making it his second top 20 single of that country along with "Cooler Than Me". In the UK, the song charted poorly. 

In 2021, the song experienced a resurgence on TikTok where users would wear a scarf and glasses and drive in a car. This got the attention of Posner himself who would repost the videos on to his official page.‘Please Don't Go' Driving With Headscarf TikTok Trend

Credits and personnel
Credits adapted from the liner notes of 31 Minutes to Takeoff.

Mike Posner – vocals, songwriting, production, drums, keyboards and programming
 Benny Blanco – background vocals, songwriting, production, drums, keyboards, programming, vocal editing and engineering
 Rob Murray – vocal editing assistant
 Serban Ghenea – audio mixing
 John Hanes – engineering
 Tim Roberts – engineering assistant

Charts

Weekly charts

Year-end charts

Certifications

Release history

References

2010 singles
2010 songs
Mike Posner songs
Songs written by Mike Posner
Songs written by Benny Blanco
Song recordings produced by Benny Blanco
American synth-pop songs
J Records singles